Tyrone Keogh (born 1982) is a South African actor, model and assistant director. He is best known for his roles in the series 24 Hours to Live, The Girl from St. Agnes and Dominion. He was named Best Dressed Man by GQ South Africa in 2012.

Early life
Keogh was born in 1982 in Johannesburg, South Africa. He is the son of actor Danny Keogh. His mother Debbie is also a film producer. In 2011, he won the 2011 Cleo Bachelor of the Year competition in Fourways, Johannesburg.

Career
At 14, Keogh began his acting career with various related production jobs as a scenic set painter, set builder, propsman and animal wrangler. At 16, he appeared in South African TV commercials for many brands such as: Vodacom UK, Pepsi USA, Opel Europe, Orange Communications, Nestle, and KFC. Then he became an art director on commercials and music videos. From 2002 to 2004, he worked as the assistant set dresser for the films Pavement, Citizen Verdict and Wake of Death. Then in 2004, he received his first film role as "Young Michael Kittridge" in the film Blast. Since then, he received many supportive roles in many major international films such as Blood Diamond (with Leonardo DiCaprio), The Deal (with Meg Ryan), Goodbye Bafana (with Joseph Fiennes) and Starship Troopers Marauder (with Casper Van Dien).

In 2008, he moved to London and signed with the agent Jeremy Conway. After that, he started to act in the short films: Service Pistol and The Tunnel. In the meantime, he also appeared in two BBC television shows. However he returned to South Africa in 2011. After relocating to Johannesburg, he got the opportunity to play the role "Jack van Reenen" in the M-Net soap opera The Wild. From 2011 to 2013, Keogh played the role as "Jack van Reenen" in the M-Net soap opera The Wild. In 2013, he acted in the serial SAF3 and played the role of "Tom". During this period, he was invited to act in some international television serials such as Dominion, Homeland and Black Sails. After the success of these serials, he acted in the Brian Smrz's film 24 Hours to Live along with Ethan Hawke.

Personal life
From 2012 to 2014, Keogh dated former Miss South Africa Nicole Flint. He married British actress Shivaani Ghai in November 2016.

Filmography

Film

Television

References

External links
 

Living people
South African male film actors
1982 births